Hamberg may refer to:

 Hamberg (surname), including a list of people with the surname
 Hamberg Glacier, South Georgia
 Hamberg Glacier (Greenland)
 Hamberg Lakes, two adjoining lakes near the glacier
 Hamberg, North Dakota, a city
 Hamberg, a 275 m summit in the Salzgitter Hills, Germany

See also
 Hamburg (disambiguation)